Khampheng Sayavutthi (ຄໍາແພງ ໄຊຍະວຸດທິ; born 19 July 1986 in Vientiane), is a Laotian former football player who played for the Laos national team.

In Laos' first ever game at the 2014 AFC Challenge Cup, Sayavutthi scored a superb bicycle kick against Turkmenistan to give his country the lead, although Turkmenistan later came back to win 5-1.

In February 2020, the Asian Football Confederation banned him from football for life for match-fixing.

International career

International goals
Scores and results list Laos' goal tally first.

References

External links
view Sayavutthi's superb bicycle kick goal

1986 births
Living people
People from Vientiane
Laotian footballers
Laos international footballers
Yotha F.C. players
Laotian expatriate footballers
Laotian expatriate sportspeople in Thailand
Expatriate footballers in Thailand
Association football forwards
Footballers at the 2014 Asian Games
Asian Games competitors for Laos